The International Religious Liberty Association (IRLA) is a non-sectarian and non-political organization promoting religious freedom. It was originally organized by the Seventh-day Adventist Church leaders in 1893 to campaign for religious freedom for all when the danger of restrictions from blue laws became apparent. Its headquarters are in Silver Spring, Maryland in the United States.

Mission statement
The IRLA's mission statement says: "The International Religious Liberty Association will disseminate the principles of religious liberty throughout the world; defend and safeguard the civil right of all people to worship or not to worship, to adopt a religion or belief of their choice, to manifest their religious convictions in observance, promulgation, and teaching, subject only to the respect for the equivalent rights of others; support the right of religious organizations to operate freely in every country by their establishing and owning charitable or educational institutions; and organize local, regional, and national chapters as well as seminars, and congresses."

History

Activities 
Since 2003, IRLA has organized the annual Religious Liberty Dinner to celebrate and bring attention to freedom of religion or belief, both in the United States and around the world. It also presents International Religious Freedom Award to individuals for their outstanding service to freedom of religion or belief. Previous awardees include H. Knox Thames (2007), Mikhail P. Kulakov (2008), David Saperstein (2009), Denton Lotz (2009), Dave Hunt (2010), Gunnar Stålsett (2011), Kit Bigelow (2011), Brian Grim (2016), and Thomas F. Farr (2017).

See also
 Liberty (Adventist magazine)

References

External links
 International Religious Liberty Association website
 Seventh-day Adventist Church State Council
 North American Religious Liberty Association

General Conference of Seventh-day Adventists
Religious organizations established in 1893
Freedom of religion
Seventh-day Adventist organizations